"Ribbon in the Sky" is a song by American singer Stevie Wonder. The ballad was first featured on the 1982 greatest hits album, Stevie Wonder's Original Musiquarium I, and charted at No. 54 pop, No. 21 Adult Contemporary, and No. 10 R&B in the US when it was released.
The song also charted in the United Kingdom, reaching #45.

In February 1983, Wonder was nominated for a Grammy Award for Best Male R&B Vocal Performance at the 25th Grammy Awards. 

In 2009, Essence magazine included "Ribbon in the Sky" in their list of the "25 Best Slow Jams of All Time".

Wonder performed a version of the song at Whitney Houston's funeral on February 18, 2012.

Cover versions
"Ribbon in the Sky" has been covered by Dennis Brown, Intro, Boyz II Men, 2 Men 4 Soul, Hiroshima, Lloydie Crucial and Ivete Sangalo, as well as being sampled by Will Smith and featured in Diana Ross's 1983 Central Park Concert (released 2012). The intro is also sampled in Jamal's "Keep It Real".

References

External links
 List of cover versions of "Ribbon in the Sky" at SecondHandSongs.com
 

1982 singles
1982 songs
Stevie Wonder songs
Songs written by Stevie Wonder
Tamla Records singles
1980s ballads
Soul ballads
Contemporary R&B ballads
Soul jazz songs
Song recordings produced by Stevie Wonder